WWTX (1290 AM) is a sports talk formatted radio station in Wilmington, Delaware. The station has local programming, along with coverage from Fox Sports Radio. WWTX is the flagship station for University of Delaware Women's Basketball and also broadcasts weekly High School Football and High School Basketball games. The station is an affiliate of the Baltimore Orioles and Baltimore Ravens.

Football
Every Friday Night in the fall, Fox Sports 1290 brings New Castle County the High School Football Game of the Week. This broadcast showcases the top matchup of the week in upstate Delaware. The season schedule begins with the DFRC Kickoff Classic and concludes with the DIAA State Championship each year. In the summer, Fox Sports, along with partner station WDOV-AM simulcast the DFRC Blue-Gold All*Star Game benefiting Delawareans with intellectual disABILITIES. The station also hands out game and season awards to outstanding student-athlete performers. Past winners have included Chris Godwin (Middletown) and Troy Reeder (Salesianum) of Penn State, Darius Wade (Middletown) of Boston College, and 2014 Fox Sports MVP Ray Jones (Hodgson) of the University of Delaware.

WWTX is also the only radio station in the state of Delaware broadcasting Baltimore Orioles baseball and Baltimore Ravens football. With a large fan base in the Wilmington, DE area and near the campus of the University of Delaware, Fox Sports 1290 AM allows locals to follow along with Blue Hens legendary QB, Joe Flacco. Fans in Delaware can also follow along with Delaware graduates and current Baltimore Ravens, Gino Gradkowski and Nick Boyle.

Basketball
During basketball season, Fox Sports 1290 stays busy with broadcasts of both Delaware Fightin' Blue Hens Women's Basketball and a High School Basketball Game of the Week. All home and away games for University of Delaware Women's Basketball can be heard on Fox Sports, as well as partner station 1410 WDOV-AM in Dover. Fox Sports 1290 was there for the 2013 Sweet 16 NCAA Tournament run by the Blue Hens led by Elena Delle Donne.

Similar to the football schedule, Fox Sports broadcasts one game each week in New Castle County for High School hoops, including the semifinal and championship games of the DIAA State Tournament. The All-Fox Sports Team is announced following each season and past winners have included Justin Perillo (Tatnall) now playing in the NFL for the Green Bay Packers, Trevor Cooney (Sanford) of Syracuse, A.J. English (Appoquinimink) of Iona, and 2015 Player of the Year, Donte DiVincenzo (Salesianum) of Villanova.

Broadcasters
Fox Sports 1290 and partner station, 94.7 WDSD use award-winning broadcasts and broadcasters. [Delaware Fightin' Blue Hens football] and Delaware Fightin' Blue Hens men's basketball is broadcast on FM by "Voice of the Blue Hens" and 2009 and 2012 National Sportscasters and Sportswriters Association Delaware Sportscaster of the Year, Scott Klatzkin. Matt Janus, the 2014 NSSA Delaware Sportscaster of the Year winner, handles play-by-play duties for Blue Hens Women's Basketball on 1290 AM. 2011 NSSA Delaware Sportswriter of the Year, Jon Buzby, and Marty Sheehan team up for High School sports broadcasts.

When Fox Sports is not airing local content, listeners can tune in to Sports Emmy Award winner, Dan Patrick's The Dan Patrick Show, and Emmy Award nominee Rich Eisen amongst other sports programming.

In September 2014 WWTX rebranded as "Fox Sports 1290" after 11 years as "1290 The Ticket."

References

External links

FCC History Cards for WWTX

WTX
IHeartMedia radio stations
Sports radio stations in the United States